Willie McLean (born 2 April 1935) is a Scottish former association footballer and manager. He managed two of the clubs he had played for, Queen of the South and Raith Rovers.

Brothers

Willie is the elder brother of Jim McLean and Tommy McLean, who also played and managed for senior Scottish clubs.

Queen of the South

McLean was part of the 1961/62 George Farm managed Queen of the South side that won promotion to the top division of Scottish football. As well as player/manager Farm, McLean was a teammate of Neil Martin, Jim Patterson and Iain McChesney.

McLean returned to Dumfries in the 1970s, this time as manager. In 1975 his second-place finish was only denied promotion to the top division of Scottish football by league reconstruction. He left Palmerston Park that summer and was replaced by Mike Jackson.

References

External links
Motherwell F.C.

1935 births
Living people
Sportspeople from Larkhall
Association football wingers
Scottish footballers
Airdrieonians F.C. (1878) players
Sheffield Wednesday F.C. players
Alloa Athletic F.C. players
Queen of the South F.C. players
Clyde F.C. players
Raith Rovers F.C. players
Scottish Football League players
Scottish football managers
Queen of the South F.C. managers
Motherwell F.C. managers
Raith Rovers F.C. managers
Ayr United F.C. managers
Greenock Morton F.C. managers
Larkhall Thistle F.C. players
Scottish Football League managers
Footballers from South Lanarkshire
Hamilton Academical F.C. players